The 1986 Ugandan Super League was the 19th season of the official Ugandan football championship, the top-level football league of Uganda.

Overview
The 1986 Uganda Super League was contested by 15 teams and was won by SC Villa, while Bell FC, Nytil FC and Masaka Union FC were relegated.

League standings

Leading goalscorer
The top goalscorer in the 1986 season was Charles Letti of Tobacco FC with 29 goals.

References

External links
Uganda - List of Champions - RSSSF (Hans Schöggl)
Ugandan Football League Tables - League321.com

Ugandan Super League seasons
Uganda
Uganda
1